Constantine Mika (born 14 September 1989) is a Samoa international rugby league footballer who plays as a  or  for Limoux Grizzlies in the Elite One Championship. He previously played for the Newcastle Knights in the NRL, Hull Kingston Rovers in the Super League, Toulouse Olympique in the Betfred Championship, as well as a spell playing rugby union for Provence Rugby in the French Pro D2.

Background
Mika was born in Auckland, New Zealand.

Early years
Mika joined the New Zealand Warriors from the local Auckland Rugby League competition where he played for Otahuhu and the Tamaki Titans in the Bartercard Cup. He made two appearances in the Toyota Cup for the Junior Warriors, however he could not break into the Wariors first grade team.

Newcastle Knights
Mika joined the Newcastle Knights from the 2009 season. He made his first grade début in Round 12 on 31 May 2009 against the Bulldogs. In June 2010 he quoted "Coming over here was the best move I've made for my footy career,"

After the conclusion of the 2011 season, Mika was released by the Knights.

Hull Kingston Rovers
Mika signed with Rovers on 26 October 2011. It was a two-year deal to join, also departing from the Knights, the new Rovers head coach, Craig Sandercock and fullback Shannon McDonnell.

Return to Australia
After completing a stint in the Super League, Mika returned to Australia to compete in the Queensland Cup and debuted for the Redcliffe Dolphins in 2014. The following year, Mika signed with the Wave Tigers of the Bundaberg Rugby League competition.

France
Mika changed codes to rugby union and signed for newly promoted Provence Rugby of the Pro D2 in the summer of 2015, to play at centre.

Toulouse Olympique
After one season playing union Mika returned to rugby league to join Toulouse Olympique in 2016.
 
After four seasons with Toulouse Mike left to join another French team.

Villeneuve XIII RLLG
Mika signed for Villeneuve XIII RLLG in the Elite One Championship in July 2020 and played the rest of the French domestic season with the club

Brooklyn Kings
In April 2021 Mika signed for Brooklyn Kings in the North American Rugby League (NARL). When the first season of the NARL was cancelled Mika became a free agent.

Keighley Cougars
Mika's signing for English side, Keighley Cougars, for the remainder of the 2021 season was announced on 14 July 2021.

Limoux Grizzlies
On 5 August 2022, it was announced that Mika had signed for Limoux Grizzlies for the 2022-23 season.

References

External links

2011 Newcastle Knights profile

1989 births
Living people
Auckland rugby league team players
Brooklyn Kings players
Central Coast Centurions players
Exiles rugby league team players
Hull Kingston Rovers players
Keighley Cougars players
Limoux Grizzlies players
New Zealand rugby league players
Newcastle Knights players
Otahuhu Leopards players
People educated at De La Salle College, Māngere East
Redcliffe Dolphins players
Rugby league locks
Rugby league players from Auckland
Rugby league second-rows
Samoa national rugby league team players
Tamaki Titans players
Toulouse Olympique players
Villeneuve Leopards players
Wyong Roos players